Fábio Nunes may refer to:
Fábio Nunes (Brazilian footballer) (born 1980), Brazilian footballer
Fábio Nunes (Portuguese footballer) (born 1992), Portuguese footballer